Sarah Vogel is a North Dakota farm advocate, author, former politician, and lawyer who served as the North Dakota Commissioner of Agriculture from 1989 to 1997. As a lawyer, she specialized in agricultural law.

Early life and education
Sarah was born in Bismarck, North Dakota in 1946. She is the granddaughter of Frank A. Vogel, chief adviser to William Langer, North Dakota’s governor from the Nonpartisan League and U.S. senator. Her father, Robert Vogel, was a former U.S. attorney and member of the North Dakota Supreme Court. Vogel grew up in Mandan, North Dakota, graduating from Mandan High School in 1964. After graduating from University of North Dakota in 1967 with a Bachelor of Arts degree, she attended and graduated from New York University School of Law.

Career

Law & Advocacy
Prior to her public service career, Sarah Vogel served as special assistant to the Secretary of the Treasury in Washington DC. Returning to her home state of North Dakota, she represented family farmers during the 1980s farm crisis, most significantly as lead attorney in Coleman v. Block, a national class action case filed on behalf of 240,000 farmers, which resulted in an injunction prohibiting USDA from foreclosing on 16,000 farm families. Her work on the case was featured in Life Magazine and later became the basis of the 1984 movie Country, starring Jessica Lange, earning the actress an Academy Award nomination.

After retiring as Agriculture Commissioner, Vogel returned to private practice at Wheeler Wolf Firm and later founded the Sarah Vogel Law Partners in Bismarck, North Dakota, where she practiced law with three other attorneys. Vogel was co-counsel Keepseagle vs. Vilsack, a national class-action lawsuit which resulted in a $680 million settlement for Native American farmers affected by the USDA's discriminatory lending practices. In 2011, Vogel went into solo law practice. Sarah Vogel Law Partners is now known as Braaten Law Office.

Public service
Vogel became an assistant attorney general in 1985. In 1986, she was named one of 20 young attorneys making a difference in the country by the American Bar Association. In 1988, she was elected North Dakota Commissioner of Agriculture, becoming the first woman in the U.S. to be elected for the position. In 1992 she was re-elected, serving through 1997. In her role as North Dakota Commissioner of Agriculture, she also served on the state’s Industrial Commission, Water Commission, and Agricultural Products Utilization Commission. 
With Senator Kent Conrad, she co-founded Marketplace of Ideas, becoming the nation’s largest rural development program conference at the time. Vogel advocated for farmer-owned cooperatives. She was succeeded by Roger Johnson.

In 1996, Vogel ran for a seat on the North Dakota Supreme Court, a bid that was ultimately unsuccessful.

Writing
Continuing her advocacy for family farmers, in 2016 she co-wrote a op-ed with musician Willie Nelson against North Dakota Measure 1, which would have furthered corporate farming in the state. The measure did not pass.

The Coleman v Block case is the subject of Vogel’s first book The Farmer’s Lawyer, published by Bloomsbury Publishers in 2021.

Awards and honors
•	2006 American Agricultural Law Association Distinguished Service Award

•	2011 Public Justice Trial Lawyer of the Year Finalist

•	2012 North Dakota Human Rights Coalition Arc of Justice Award

Bibliography
•	1984 “The Law of Hard Times: Debtor and Farmer Relief Actions of the 1933 North Dakota Legislative Session” North Dakota Law Review: Vol. 60

•	1994 “The Effects of NAFTA upon North Dakota State Law” North Dakota Law Review: Vol. 70 : No. 3, Article 1

•	2021 The Farmer’s Lawyer: The North Dakota Nine and the Fight to Save the Family Farm(Bloomsbury)

Notes

1946 births
Living people
North Dakota Commissioners of Agriculture
Women in North Dakota politics
North Dakota Democrats
University of North Dakota alumni
New York University School of Law alumni
20th-century American lawyers
20th-century American politicians
20th-century American women politicians
21st-century American lawyers
North Dakota lawyers
20th-century American women lawyers
21st-century American women lawyers